Mendocino is the second album  by country rock group The Sir Douglas Quintet, released in April 1969 on Smash Records. The release of the album was expedited as the result of the success of the title song, which peaked at No. 27 on the Billboard Hot 100 chart during a fifteen-week stay in early 1969. The album peaked at No. 81 on the Billboard 200 charts.  Neon Records re-released the album in 2001 and 2008.

Track listing

Personnel
The Sir Douglas Quintet
 Doug Sahm – vocals, guitar, pedal steel guitar, fiddle
 Frank Morin – vocals, horns
 Harvey Kagan – bass guitar
 Augie Meyers – organ, piano, keyboards
 John Perez – drums

References

External links
[ Allmusic – The Sir Douglas Quintet (biography)]

1969 albums
Smash Records albums
Sir Douglas Quintet albums